Florida Caverns State Park is a state park of Florida in the United States, part of the Florida State Parks system. It is located in the Florida Panhandle near Marianna. It is the only Florida state park with air-filled caves accessible to the public.

The limestone caves in the park have stalagmites, stalactites and flowstones formed by the erosion of bedrock. Other formations are above ground, including rivers and springs.

Florida Caverns State Park and the neighboring golf course were constructed by the Civilian Conservation Corps as part of the New Deal. The park opened in 1942.

Park features
The park is notable for its geological features, a protected area of karst topography. This geology hosts an ecosystem with plants and animals that are adapted to the limestone substrates. The caves and waterways have blind crayfish, bats, salamanders, and other species. Native Americans inhabited the area, and it is a site of archaeological interest.

The park allows nature study, exploring, and sightseeing. The 9-hole golf course is open. Other activities and amenities in the park include camping, hiking, boating, horseback riding, and fishing. There is a visitor center with interpretive exhibits and concessions. Rangers conduct several tours daily.

Gallery

References

External links

Florida Caverns State Park at Florida State Parks
Florida Caverns State Park. Stateparks.com.

State parks of Florida
Parks in Jackson County, Florida
National Natural Landmarks in Florida
Caves of Florida
Show caves in the United States
Limestone caves
Protected areas established in 1942
Springs of Florida
Florida Native American Heritage Trail
Landforms of Jackson County, Florida
1942 establishments in Florida
Civilian Conservation Corps in Florida
National Park Service rustic in Florida